Odine Kirsten (born 28 July 1994) is a South African former cricketer who played as a right-arm medium bowler and right-handed batter. She appeared in nine One Day Internationals and two Twenty20 Internationals for South Africa in 2016 and 2017. She played domestic cricket for Easterns and Northerns.

References

External links
 
 

1994 births
Living people
Cricketers from Johannesburg
South African women cricketers
South Africa women One Day International cricketers
South Africa women Twenty20 International cricketers
Easterns women cricketers
Northerns women cricketers
20th-century South African women
21st-century South African women